The Peace and Friendship Stadium, commonly known by its acronym SEF, is a multi-purpose indoor arena that is located in Piraeus, on the coastal zone of Attica, Greece. The arena is mostly known for being the home to EuroLeague team Olympiacos, and is the central venue of the Faliro Coastal Zone Olympic Complex. It opened in 1985 and its design was inspired by Palasport di San Siro.

The arena complex also contains a 942-seat amphitheater, a weight training room, a full practice facility, three auxiliary courts that house the Olympiacos youth clubs, and the Olympiacos team office. It is also used as training center for the Hellenic Amateur Athletic Association.

History

The Peace and Friendship Stadium opened in 1985, and its construction cost was €25,000,000 in 1983 prices. It was designed by the architectural firm "Thymios Papagiannis and Associates". The arena is built opposite to the Karaiskakis Stadium, located in the western end of the Phaleron Bay. It was inaugurated on February 16, 1985, at the first Panhellenic Athletics Indoor Championship, and hosted the 1985 European Athletics Indoor Championships in March. Originally it was designed and operated for a dual use as an ice hockey rink and as basketball stadium. The first Greek Ice Hockey Championship was held in the stadium in 1989. The operation of the skating rink was stopped for the use of other sports.

In 1991, the arena won the Golden Award from IAKS, the International Association for Sports and Leisure Facilities.

Since the 1991–92 season, the Peace and Friendship Stadium has been the home court to Greek League and EuroLeague professional basketball club Olympiacos. The arena was closed from April 2002, to early 2004, for renovation works, at a total cost of €7,300,000, and hosted the indoor volleyball tournament during the 2004 Summer Olympics. During the period that the arena was closed for renovations, Olympiacos played at the Glyfada Makis Liougas Sportshall, during the 2001–02 season, and at the Korydallos Sports Hall, during the 2002–03 and 2003–04 seasons. The Greek Basket League club Lavrio used the arena to host its FIBA Champions League home games, during the 2021–22 season.

The arena's total capacity varies, depending on the collapsible bleachers used in the lower level, besides its 11,640 permanent seating in the mid and upper levels, with additional temporary seating, it currently seats a total of 12,000 people for basketball games. The Peace and Friendship Stadium seats up to 14,776 for basketball games, with all the bleachers in use.

Training facility and auxiliary courts

The arena features a full training court for the senior men's team of Olympiacos, which is also used by the club's reserve team, Olympiacos B Development Team. The arena also has additional auxiliary basketball courts. The auxiliary courts are used by the youth clubs of Olympiacos.

Other uses
The arena is occasionally used for events like congresses, music concerts, and indoor motocross races. The Scorpions, Phil Collins, Dire Straits, Status Quo, UB40, Gloria Estefan, Deep Purple, and Placebo, are among the artists who have performed at the Peace and Friendship Stadium.

Outside the main arena, in the same stadium building, there is a 942-seat amphitheater, and various other halls of a total area of 16,048 sqm, where exhibitions and congresses take place.

Transportation
The Peace and Friendship Stadium is located in the Neo Faliro area of Piraeus municipality, on the coastal Poseidonos Avenue, and at the end of the Kifissou Avenue. It is 2 km away from the port of Piraeus. It sits on a major transportation hub, next to the Faliro metro station on Athens Metro Line 1, and the SEF tram stop, the terminus of Athens Tram.

Notable events hosted

Indoor athletics
1985 European Athletics Indoor Championships
Balkan Athletics Indoor Championships (1991–2002, 2007, 2009)
Volleyball
1989 European Champions' Cup Final
1992 European Champions' Cup Final Four
1993 European Champions' Cup Final Four
1994  World Championship
1995 Men's European Volleyball Championship
1996 European Cup Winners' Cup Final Four
2000 2nd World Qualification Tournament Men Pre Olympic Tournament 
2004 Summer Olympics – Volleyball tournament
2005 European Top Teams Cup Final Four
Basketball
1985 FIBA European Champions' Cup Final
1987 EuroBasket
1989 FIBA European Cup Winners' Cup Final
1991 FIBA Centennial Jubilee
1993 FIBA European League Final Four
1998 FIBA World Championship
Wrestling
1986 European Championships
1988 World Cup (Greco-Roman Men's)
1999 World Championship (Greco-Roman Men's)
  Gymnastics
1990 European Women's Artistic Gymnastics Championships
1991 World Rhythmic Gymnastics Championships
 Weightlifting
1999 World Championships

See also
 List of basketball arenas by capacity
 List of indoor arenas in Greece

References

External links

Official website 
SEF at Olympiacos B.C.'s official website
SEF at stadia.gr
Basketball images at Getty images
The transformations of SEF 

1985 establishments in Greece
Basketball venues in Greece
Faliro Coastal Zone Olympic Complex
Handball venues in Greece
Indoor arenas in Greece
Indoor track and field venues
Modernist architecture in Greece
Olympiacos B.C.
Olympic volleyball venues
Sports venues completed in 1985
Taekwondo venues
Volleyball venues in Greece